José Manuel Correia (born 26 July 1925) was a Portuguese water polo player. He competed in the men's tournament at the 1952 Summer Olympics.

References

External links
 

1925 births
Possibly living people
Portuguese male water polo players
Olympic water polo players of Portugal
Water polo players at the 1952 Summer Olympics
Place of birth missing (living people)